Delphyre elachia is a moth of the subfamily Arctiinae. It was described by Harrison Gray Dyar Jr. in 1914. It is found in Panama.

References

Euchromiina
Moths described in 1914